Alexander Melnikov may refer to:

Alexander Melnikov (pianist) (born 1973), Russian pianist
Alexander Melnikov (politician) (1930–2011), Soviet and Russian politician